Bonetta was an American vessel that the British Royal Navy captured in 1808. She then became a West Indiaman. A French privateer captured her in 1810.

Capture
Prize money was paid in 1814, and 1839.

British merchantman
Bonetta first appeared in Lloyd's Register (LR) in 1809 with J.Cock, master, Hay & Co., owners, and trade London–Antigua. She was described as an American prize.

Capture: On 4 December 1810 the French privateer  captured Bonetta. Lloyd's List reported that the capture of Bonetta, Cock, master, took place off Sombrero, Anguilla as Bonetta was sailing from Guadeloupe to Charleston. It further reported that Duke of Dantzick was armed with fourteen 18-pounder carronades and had a crew of 100 men. Duke had recently captured Industry, Moore, master, which was sailing from St Kitts to Wilmington, and a Spanish three-masted schooner carrying dry goods from Cadiz to Vera Cruz. Duke of Dantzick destroyed both. However, Bonetta arrived at Cadiz on 30 January 1811, and not in French possession. Aregnaudeau had put a prize crew of ten of his men, plus two Spaniards and two Portuguese on Bonetta. On 22 December the Spaniards and Portuguese attacked the Frenchmen, killed three, and took possession of the ship. While Bonetta was at Cadiz, a gale from 27 to 29 March cost her her foremast, bowsprit, etc. The entry for Bonetta in the Register of Shipping (RS) for 1811 carried the annotation "Captured".

Lloyd's Register continued to carry Bonetta, and conflated her with a later Bonetta that was an American prize that appeared shortly after the Bonetta of this article was lost.

Notes

Citations

Ships built in the United States
1809 ships
Captured ships
Age of Sail merchant ships of England